George Benjamin William Lewis (19 November 1818 – 18 July 1906) commonly referred to as G. B. W. Lewis, or G. B. Lewis, was an English circus performer, later a circus and theatre entrepreneur in Australia.

History
Lewis was born in Clement's Lane, London, a son of William and Susan Lewis. At age 14 he was engaged as an acrobatic performer in Andrew Ducrow's circus at Astley's Royal Amphitheatre, followed by six years with Pablo Fanque's equestrian troupe, then in 1846 with Hengler's Circus, where he became a leading performer, touring Europe and earning at one event £100 a night for his 15-minute act, and soon became quite wealthy.

Attracted by the gold rush which was then under way in Victoria, Australia, he arrived in Melbourne in 1854 with "Little Tom" his diminutive 14-year-old assistant, and joined Rowe's American Circus, which had been at the corner of Lonsdale and Stephen (now Exhibition) streets, Melbourne since June 1852. Lewis and "Lilliputian Tom" were with Rowe from February to October 1854, when the circus closed.

Entrepreneur 
According to an often-repeated account, Lewis had a personal wealth of £30,000, which he invested in building the huge ( high) covered enclosure on Spring Street, naming it Astley's Amphitheatre. Other accounts have him persuading a glib Irish-Californian hotelier and "stump orator", named Tom Mooney, to finance and build it next door to his National Hotel, and take him as its first lessee, with naming rights. Astley's Amphitheatre, named for the London venue, opened 12 September 1854.

Lewis closed Astley's in June 1855 due to lack of patronage.
In September he was granted a licence for the Mazeppa Hotel corner Spring and Little Bourke streets, adjacent the amphitheatre, which he advertised to let.
He was found insolvent (assets £1172, liabilities £2800) in October and his licence cancelled in November.
Mooney proved insolvent in November 1855. Ownership of Astley's Amphitheatre and the Mazeppa Hotel passed to Samuel Boyle, who leased both to George Coppin; Coppin renamed the amphitheatre "Princess's Theatre" and the Mazeppa "Princess Hotel". Mooney's National Hotel passed to William Hutchinson, and was renamed Excelsior in 1857. Mooney in 1864 founded a savings bank and an insurance company, then decamped for his homeland in October 1870, taking somewhere between £15,000 and £40,000 with him.
Lewis slowly rebuilt his fortune by playing at the Cremorne Gardens, Melbourne and touring his equestrian act through country Victoria. He took a company to the English-speaking enclaves in China and the Far East in 1859. He then decided his future lay in theatre management. In 1863 he engaged a troupe which included Lizzy Naylor, Tilly Earl, and other members of the Edouin family (see below), which toured for several years. He married Rose Edouin in Shanghai, China in 1864. They made further extended tours of the East in 1867 and 1872.

Bijou theatre
When the foundation stone of the Victorian Academy of Music was laid on 23 May 1876, Lewis had already signed up with the owner, Joseph Aarons, as its first lessee, and on its opening night 6 November 1876 he had Ilma de Murska as guest vocalist, John Hill and Alberto Zelman were guest conductors and Lewis read a poem written by Dr Neild for the occasion. From the outset he called it "a bijou [small and elegant] theatre", and the earliest advertisements were headed both "Academy of Music" and "Bijou Theatre", making a virtue of its smaller size than either the Theatre Royal or Opera House.
Concerts and plays were staged on alternate days, the first being T. W. Robertson's comedy Home, played by Lewis's stock company, headed by Mrs Lewis.

One of Lewis's coups was securing the veteran actor William Creswick, who played at the Academy from August 1877 to 11 December with plays such as Sheridan Knowles' Virginius and William Tell to Shakespearean dramas and the comedy The Jealous Wife to full houses. In preparation for his return, Lewis in July 1878 also took the lease of the Opera House, making considerable improvements. The Creswick season, from 7 September to 23 November, mostly Shakespeare tragedies but also favorites such as A New Way to Pay Old Debts. and Robertson's Ours.

In January 1880 a topical burlesque, The Happy Land, was effectively banned from production by the Government, on threat of cancellation of the Bijou's licence. Creswick returned that year, reduced in voice, but still attracting good houses.
The name "Academy of Music" was dropped that same year. and J. A. Wilson, owner of the Academy of Music Hotel, purchased the leasehold theatre from Aarons in 1884.
Lewis chose not to renew the lease when it expired on 1 March 1885.
In that year he was elected president of the Australasian Dramatic and Musical Association.

He died at the Alfred Hospital following surgery.

Mrs G. B. W. Lewis
Lewis married the actress Miss Rose Edouin, born Bryer (29 January 1844 – 24 August 1925) in 1864
Rose first came to Australia with the Edouin Family of juvenile burlesque artistes, who with their parents John Edwin Bryer and Sarah Elizabeth Bryer (née May) appeared in Melbourne at the Theatre Royal on 14 July 1857 in Frolics in France. Also involved were her sisters Eliza and Julia; and brothers John and Willie, who later had a career in America. They finally settled in London.

In the 1880s Mrs Lewis ran a drama club for juveniles which culminated in a production of HMS Pinafore. Flora Graupner was one graduate of this organization who went on to greater things.

In 1892 she played a season at the Strand Theatre, London, in The Jealous Wife.

In 1894–95 she produced and starred in Grundy and Wills's The Pompadour, Wills's Jane Shore, Hamlet, and other pieces in Ballarat, Bendigo, Launceston, and Adelaide.
She shared with Louise Pomeroy the distinction of being one of the few females to play Prince Hamlet in Australia.

In 1897 she became insolvent as a result of the bank failures of the time.

In 1900 she returned to the Melbourne stage, playing Mrs Vinard in Trilby for J. C. Williamson's.

In 1906 she played Lady Wynnegate in The Squaw Man in all states for Williamson's.
In her career she played over 1,000 characters, and in later years was a respected drama teacher.

She died in Harrogate, Yorkshire.

As an author 
Mrs Lewis wrote two pantomimes:
 Mrs G. B. W. Lewis (1876) The Heathen Chinee ; or, Harlequin Bluebeard and the Good Fairy of the Plumed Throne of Fairyland
 G. B. W. Lewis, Mrs G. B. W. Lewis (1880) Little Goody Two Shoes ; or, Harlequin Who Killed Cock Robin?
a play
 Rose Edouin Lewis (1900) The Wreck of the Inverness ; or, Twenty Years After
and a musical:
 Rose Edouin Lewis with George Encyl Lewis (composer) (1908) A Spree in Paris and What Happened aka A Trip to Paris

Edouin family 
John Edwin/Edouin Bryer (1810– ) married widow Sarah Elizabeth Lind née May in 1832.
Charles Edouin Bryer (c. 1833–1869) married Louisa Elizabeth "Lizzie" Naylor (1845 – 11 July 1907) on 22 April 1863
Lillie May Bryer (died May 1940) married Herbert Jackson Piersol (born 1866) on 25 November 1895
George John Bryer (1865– ) theatre manager, married Mary Ann Maria Lennard in 1891
William Edouin Bryer, business manager for the Brough-Flemming company.
John William Bryer "John Edouin" (c. December 1840 – 17 October 1875 in Mumbai) married Martha Matilda "Tilly" Earl (died 11 February 1888). She married again to Charles H. Newton (died 1888) 
Eliza Sarah Bryer (c. July 1842 – 1857)
Rose Edouin Bryer "Rose Edouin" (29 January 1844 – 24 August 1925) married G. B. W. Lewis in 1864, subject of this article
G(eorge) Encyl Lewis (c. 1865 – 1 December 1918) married cousin Frances May Grahame (below)
William Frederick Bryer "Willie Edouin" (1 January 1846 – 1908) married Alice Atherton (1854–1899) c. 1873.
Daisy Bryer (c. 1875– )
May Bryer (c. 1876– )
Julia Lucy Bryer ( – 3 March 1891 in Philadelphia) married William Forbes Grahame in India in 1873
daughter (c. 1875– )
Frances May Grahame (died 7 March 1902), perhaps the same person as directly above, married cousin, musician George Encyl Lewis (see above)

Further reading 
Mimi Colligan (2013) Circus and Stage: The Theatrical Adventures of Rose Edouin and G. B. W. Lewis Monash University Publishing ISBN 9781922235022

Personal
Lewis built "Shanghai Villa" on the St. Kilda Road, opposite Fawkner Park. He sold its entire "very superior, well kept" furniture, also horses, carriages, dogs etc., by auction in 1867 preparatory to leaving for Europe. Some valuable pieces were donated or loaned to the Art Gallery.
The residence was let by Lewis for £260 p.a.
He had another sale of furniture and art objects in June 1872 when about to leave for India.
The property was sold in 1882 when they left for Europe.

Family 
George Encyl Lewis (c. 1865 – 1 December 1918) was the only child of Mr and Mrs Lewis to survive childhood. He was an accomplished musician, and travelled with G. H. Snazelle to London to assist at his concert at the Egyptian Hall in 1894. He was conductor of the Adelphi Theatre, orchestra in 1899.
He conducted the orchestra which accompanied the first production of Wilson Barrett's The Never Never Land in 1902.
He composed a musical comedy A Spree in Paris, for which his mother wrote the libretto.

Notes

References 

1818 births
1906 deaths
British circus performers
Australian circus performers
Australian theatre managers and producers